Victoria Reznik (born ) is a Canadian group rhythmic gymnast. She represents her nation at international competitions.

She competed at world championships, including at the 2015 World Rhythmic Gymnastics Championships.

She is the twin sister of Anjelika Reznik.

References

External links
http://www.yorkregion.com/pan-am-games-story/5712150-vaughan-twins-angelika-victoria-reznik-named-to-rhythmic-gymnastics-team/
http://results.toronto2015.org/IRS/en/gymnastics-rhythmic/athlete-profile-n10177114-reznik-victoria.htm
http://olympic.ca/team-canada/victoria-reznik/

1995 births
Living people
Canadian rhythmic gymnasts
Sportspeople from Almaty
Sportspeople from Ontario
People from Vaughan
Kazakhstani emigrants to Canada
Gymnasts at the 2015 Pan American Games
Gymnasts at the 2010 Summer Youth Olympics
Pan American Games medalists in gymnastics
Pan American Games bronze medalists for Canada
Twin sportspeople
Canadian twins
Medalists at the 2015 Pan American Games
Youth Olympic bronze medalists for Canada
21st-century Canadian women